Paracale, officially the Municipality of Paracale, is a 3rd class municipality in the province of Camarines Norte, Philippines. According to the 2020 census, it has a population of 60,198 people.

Paracle’s economy is driven by agriculture and small scale, often informal gold mining and gold ore processing. Rice, corn, coconut and root crops and vegetables are the major agricultural products. Being a coastal community with a number of historical sites and providing boat access to Calaguas Group of Islands it also has some claim as a tourist destination.

History

Paracale was an active fishing and small scale mining community prior to the Spanish colonial period. In 1572, attracted by news of gold deposits, Juan de Salcedo petitioned to search for mines in the Bicol region. Arriving by boat from the North, Salcedo’s expedition found mining operations at Paracale, but was forced to retreat due to sickness and lack of provisions. A more permanent settlement and mission post was established by Franciscan friars in 1581. It was established as a town in 1611. However, the mission was abandoned in 1634, reestablished by the Franciscans in 1638, but was abandoned again in 1662. In 1687, the Franciscan missionaries returned to their mission.

In 1863, Paracale was then formally established as a town. Seventeen years later, the Franciscans returned to Paracale to reestablish church administration.

Gold mining

The town's name was derived from para cale, meaning “canal digger.”

Small scale mining in Camarines Norte pre dates the Spanish colonial period, but the region came to prominence in 1626 when a sizable gold deposit was identified close to the current location of Paracale town. Spaniards employed local labour to extract gold-bearing gravel from adjacent rivers and streams, although mining operations were described as intermittent, small in scale and rarely profitable due to frequent flooding, in 1688 it was recorded that miners in Paracale were paid three reals per week plus food for extraction of gold ore.

During the period of American colonial rule dredges were used to mine primary lode deposits.

Artisanal mining for gold still persists in many locations adjacent to the town. An ILO report published in 2017 estimated that about half the population of the town were engaged in small scale mining activities either as a financier, mine worker, processor or independent gold panner. Compressor mining, a hazardous informal mining method where ore is extracted by divers in flooded, narrow shafts while breathing through an air tube connected to makeshift compressor, was banned in the Philippines in 2012. Nonetheless Parcale attracted significant attention in November 2013 when a collapse of informal mining operations on the beach led to the deaths of a number of compressor mining divers. In 2021, the Philippine National Police sought the closure of all illegal mining activities in Camarines Norte as the components of improvised explosive devices used by NPA terrorists were established as coming from illegal mining sites in the area.

Barangays

Paracale is politically subdivided into 27 barangays.

Demographics

Climate

Economy

Infrastructure
Transportation Land transportation is the primary means of transporting people, goods and services from the barangay to the town proper of Paracale. The municipality is connected to its different barangays by the municipality's major roads, namely the Maharlika Highway.

 Water supply The barangays of the municipality are being served by levels I, II and III water supply. Other barangays are being served by shallow wells, deep wells or dug wells.

Power supply Paracale is being served by electric power, formerly by the defunct Hidalgo Electric Enterprise, now by the National Power Corporation through the Camarines Norte Electric Cooperative (CANORECO). After the establishment of this cooperative, there was a great improvement in terms of power supply condition in the municipality.

Communication Paracale has a telecommunication system that is being run by the Department of Transportation and Communication (DOTC). There are two satellites of Smart, Globe. There is postal office and has a staff of one mail carriers serving all barangays in the municipality. These personnel cannot adequately serve the entire from the lack of personnel; another problem is the difficulty in the delivery of mails in the remote and far-flung barangays.

Mining companies
 United Paragon Mining Corporation ( Not Operational)
 Unidragon Mining and Development Corporation ( Not Operational due to Cease and desist order by MGB)
 Baotong Mining Corporation  (Not Operational due to Cease and desist order by MGB)
 Konka Fulim Mining and Development Corp. (KFMDC) ( Not Operational)

Media
Paracale and its surrounding area is being served by a local community radio, Radyo Natin 102.5

Churches 
 Parroquia de Nuestra Señora de Candelaria, established in 1611, it is one of the first churches in Camarines Norte and was built by Franciscan Friars. The church features the canonically crowned miraculous image of Our Lady of Candelaria.
 Parish of Saint Roch in Batobalani
 Parish of San Roque in Tabas
 Iglesia Ni Cristo
 Kingdom Hall of Jehovah's Witnesses
 City Of Praise
 Church of Jesus Christ of Latter-Day Saints
 Seventh Day Adventist
 Ang Dating Daan
 United Church of Christ in the Phils (UCCP)
 Paracale Evangelical Church

Government
Municipal officials:
 Mayor: Romeo Yebra Moreno
 Vice Mayor: Bernadette Epino Asutilla
 Councilors:
 Bidoy Oco
 Amelia Ortiz Oco
 Rav Russel Moreno
 Cesar Cariño
 Zaldy Enova Moya
 Darwin San Luis
 Reno Pisalbon
 Willy Peralta

Education

Public Elementary Schools

Public Secondary Schools
 Paracale National High School - Marlo Fiel P. Sultan, EdD., School Principal III
 Batobalani National High School - Euginio Abanto, EdD., School Principal I
 Tabas National High School - Pedro Talavera, School Principal I
 Gumaus National High School - Joan M. Malaluan, Head Teacher II
 Maximo Manarang High School - Ariel Balmeo, Head Teacher II

References

External links
 [ Philippine Standard Geographic Code]
Philippine Census Information
Pabirik Festival Website
Paracale Tourism Website
Paracale.net website

Municipalities of Camarines Norte